The College of Nosa Señora da Antiga is located in the town of Monforte de Lemos (Lugo, Spain), in the Ribeira Sacra. Built-in the Herreriano style, the school is often known as El Escorial of Galicia, being of the few manifestations of this style in this community.

History 
The college was founded by Cardinal Rodrigo de Castro. The college was a Seminary until 2023 and later a university, displaying up to seven chairs in a time when it was not yet established in the province. Originally run by the Jesuits, their order was expelled from Spain, through the Pragmatic Sanction of 1767 led to the elimination of any existing symbol to remember their existence in the country.

Architecture

The church has an altar of wood carved by Francisco de Moure which he could not finish during his life and was then completed by his son. On one side of the altar there is a statue of Cardinal Rodrigo de Castro praying, which was created by John of Bologna. The statue, located above the remains of Cardinal, is confronted with a picture of Our Lady of Antigua. Behind the painting is another toml.

The school has two cloisters, and appears to be incomplete in its west wing. The monumental staircase, built from 1594 to 1603, is located in the east wing; its design is built on three arches, without apparent support, that support thirteen, nine thirteen steps each. The ladder is held thanks to a carefully calculated play of forces. The steps are carved from a single piece of high-quality granite. On the ground, drawing of the projection of the staircase can be seen, drawn for its construction.

Museum 
An art gallery is also located there highlighting several works by El Greco. Foremost among these is a painting of Francis of Assisi holding a skull. 

Other works in the gallery include five works of the Mannerist painter Andrea del Sarto, "St. Margaret of Cortona", "St. Agnes", "St. Catherine of Alexandria", "San Pedro" and "San Juan Bautista". The painting "The Adoration of the Magi" by Van der Goes is only a copy, since the original was sold in 1913 to Staatliche Museen in Berlin for one million two hundred thousand pesetas allowing completion of the works of the school. The gallery is complete with two works by the School of Compostela, "Death" and "Doomsday", and an anonymous portrait of Cardinal Rodrigo de Castro. The museum also has several incunabula and manuscripts, among them an incomplete copy of "Libro de la Caza de las Aves" ("Book of Bird Hunting"), a treatise on falconry by Pedro López de Ayala which he authored during his captivity in Portugal, as well as all personal belongings of the cardinal.

See also

 History of early modern period domes
 List of Jesuit sites

External links
 College of Piarist Fathers - official site

Universities and colleges in Spain
Monforte de Lemos
Galician architecture
Renaissance architecture in Spain
Museums in Galicia (Spain)
Art museums and galleries in Spain
Churches in Galicia (Spain)